Frederick Le Gros Clark (3 September 1892 – 22 September 1977) was a British children's author, and an expert on malnutrition.

Early life
Frederick Le Gros Clark was born on 3 September 1892 in Chislet, Kent, England, the son of Rev. Edward Travers Clark, and his wife Ethel May. His grandfather was the surgeon Frederick Le Gros Clark (1811-1892).

He was awarded a scholarship for Blundell's School, Tiverton from 1906, and a scholarship to study Classics at Balliol College, Oxford in 1911. He served throughout the First World War, and had an accident on the very last day, losing his right hand and his sight in both eyes.

His brother was Sir Wilfrid Le Gros Clark, Professor of Anatomy at the University of Oxford and the University of London.

Career
In 1939, he co-wrote "Our Food Problem and Its Relation to Our National Defences".

Publications
Apparition (1928) - adult novel
Between Two Men (1935) - adult novel
The Adventures of the Little Pig (1937) - for children
The Deep Shelter Mystery - for children
Audrey in the Spring - for children

Personal life
He married Ida Clark. His second wife was Winifred.

Le Gros Clark died in Cambridge on 22 September 1977, aged 85.

References

1892 births
1977 deaths
British children's writers
British nutritionists
British blind people
Alumni of Balliol College, Oxford
People educated at Blundell's School